Dadu District is a suburban district in southwestern Taichung, Taiwan. The eponymous Dadu River flows nearby.

History 
The Yingpu Culture was a Late Neolithic culture in mid-Taiwan.

Dadu was the historical capital of the Kingdom of Middag which was established by the Taiwanese indigenous tribes of Papora, Babuza, Pazeh, and Hoanya.

Huangxi Academy was built in 1887 and was the predecessor of Dadu Elementary School.

Administrative divisions 
Dadu District consists of 17 villages.
 Chenggong Village
 Dadu Village
 Dadong Village
 Dingjie Village
 Fushan Village
 Huangsi Village
 Jhebu Village
 Jhonghe Village
 Rueijing Village
 Shanyang Village
 Shejiao Village
 Sinsing Village
 Wangtian Village
 Yingpu Village
 Yonghe Village
 Yongshun Village
 Zihciang Village

Tourist attractions 
 Huangxi Academy

Transportation 

 TRA Dadu station
 TRA Zhuifen station

See also 
 Taichung

References

External links 

  

Districts of Taichung
Taiwan placenames originating from Formosan languages